Louis-Philippe Gélinas (5 April 1902 – 1 January 1976) was a Liberal party member of the Senate of Canada. He was born in Montreal, Quebec and became a business executive.

The son of Arthur Gélinas and Laurette Panneton, he was educated in Westmount, at Loyola College and the Université de Montréal. Gélinas was a Wing Commander in the Royal Canadian Air Force during World War II. He served as director for a number of firms, including Geoffrion, Robert and Gélinas Co., Canadian International Paper Company, Canada Cement Company and John Labatt Ltd.

He was appointed to the Senate for the Montarville, Quebec division on 11 June 1963 following nomination by Prime Minister Lester B. Pearson. Gélinas remained in that role until he resigned on 10 December 1975. Gélinas died the following month, on 1 January 1976.

References

External links
 

1902 births
1976 deaths
Businesspeople from Montreal
Canadian senators from Quebec
Liberal Party of Canada senators
Politicians from Montreal